James Stephens Speed (February 14, 1811 – August 7, 1860) was the ninth Mayor of Louisville, Kentucky.

Life
His father, John Speed, moved to Jefferson County in about 1795 and established a farm on Salt River Rd. (which became Dixie Highway), about 9 miles south of Louisville. James Speed moved to Louisville in his late teens and within a few years became a partner in a building and railroad contracting firm, Pickett and Speed.

He was elected to the Kentucky House of Representatives in 1843, and appointed a United States marshal by president Zachary Taylor in 1849. He was served as mayor of Louisville from April 26, 1852 until April 1855. The rules governing the office were confusing, and Speed was actually re-elected by popular vote each year of his term, yet never awarded an election certificate. Speed argued that his original election meant his term lasted until 1856, but a resolution in 1855 called for a new election that year. The election was won by Know-Nothing candidate John Barbee. Speed did not run in the election, believing he would remain mayor anyway, but Barbee was recognized as mayor by the city council, overriding Speed's veto. Speed appealed but ultimately lost at the Kentucky Supreme Court. 

The Know-Nothings were inspired by editorials of the Louisville Daily Courier, which opposed Speed for his Catholicism (he was a Catholic convert), a major local controversy of the time (Speed was the first Catholic mayor). In 1856 Speed moved to Chicago, where he spent the remainder of his life. As mayor, he was chiefly concerned with public works projects, such as the water works and street improvement. 

Speed died on August 7, 1860, in Chicago.

Notes

References

External links

1811 births
1860 deaths
Converts to Roman Catholicism
Members of the Kentucky House of Representatives
Mayors of Louisville, Kentucky
Politicians from Louisville, Kentucky
United States Marshals
19th-century American politicians